Hatagawa Dam  is a gravity dam located in Kyoto Prefecture in Japan. The dam is used for flood control and water supply. The catchment area of the dam is 21.2 km2. The dam impounds about 20  ha of land when full and can store 1960 thousand cubic meters of water. The construction of the dam was started on 1992 and completed in 2012.

See also
List of dams in Japan

References

Dams in Kyoto Prefecture